James Pierrepont Greaves (1 February 1777 – 11 March 1842), was an English mystic, educational reformer, socialist and progressive thinker who founded Alcott House, a short-lived utopian community and free school in Surrey. He described himself as a "sacred socialist" and was an advocate of vegetarianism and other health practices.

Life and work

Pierrepont Greaves was born in Merton in Surrey, the son of Charles Greaves, a draper, and Ann Pierrepont, and spent his early life engaged as a merchant and draper in London. According to one account the firm in which he was a partner became bankrupt in 1806 owing to the Milan and Berlin decrees of Napoleon which blocked trade between Britain and the continent; another source says that "after getting rich in commerce he lost his fortune by imprudent speculations". At any rate, he surrendered all his property to his creditors, and lived for some time on the income allowed him for winding up the affairs of his establishment. He eventually rebuilt his business.

In 1817, Greaves experienced "some strong interior visitations" which led him to a belief in the "divine in man" and convinced him that he had a spiritual mission in life to share his commitment to the love of God with others. In 1818, he joined Johann Heinrich Pestalozzi, the Swiss educational reformer, then established at Yverdon, where he taught English. There he met fellow socialist Robert Owen.

Returning to England in 1825 he founded the London Infant School Society and became its secretary. In 1832 he was settled in the village of Randwick, Gloucestershire, and engaged in an industrial scheme for the benefit of agricultural labourers with his sister Mary Ann Greaves. From the 1830s onwards he referred to himself as a "sacred socialist".

Resuming his residence in London, he drew around him many friends. A philosophical society founded by him in 1836, and known as the "Aesthetic Society", met for some time at a house in Burton Street in Camden. His educational experiences gradually led him to his unconventional philosophical views. "As Being is before knowing and doing, I affirm that education can never repair the defects of Birth". Hence the necessity of "the divine existence being developed and associated with man and woman prior to marriage". He was a follower of Jacob Boehme and influenced by German transcendentalism. He was also influenced by Thomas Taylor, William Law and the philosophy of neoplatonism. Greaves worked with Charles and Elizabeth Mayo to found the Home and Colonial School Society in Gray's Inn Road in 1836. This teaching institution was dedicated to Pestalozzi whose educational ideas ignored the idea of rote-learning. The new organization included a model infant school where these ideas could be developed.

Greaves and his followers founded Alcott House, in Ham, Surrey (now in Richmond in Greater London), a utopian spiritual community and progressive school which lasted from 1838 to 1848. It was named after Amos Bronson Alcott, the American transcendentalist, with whom Greaves had a long correspondence, and who visited the community in 1842.

Religious writer Francis Foster Barham (1808–1871), a member of Greaves' Aesthetic Society, considered him as essentially a superior man to Coleridge, and with much higher spiritual attainments and experience. He wrote, "his numerous acquaintances regarded him as a moral phenomenon, as a unique specimen of human character, as a study, as a curiosity, and an absolute undefinable". An acquaintance whom Greaves frequently visited observed that he was often in financial distress, as he did not attach great importance to conventional notions of earning a living.

In his lifetime, he published none of his writings separately, but printed a few of them in obscure periodicals. His last years were spent at Alcott House, where he died on 11 March 1842, aged 65. Two volumes were afterwards published from his manuscripts. Some minor publications, also posthumous, appeared in the British Museum catalogue.

Vegetarianism

Greaves was a vegetarian and advocated hydrotherapy, drinking water and a life of celibacy. Greaves opposed the consumption of alcohol and meat and proposed daily cold showers and bathing in spring water. His recommended diet was uncooked fruit, nuts and vegetables.

References

Attributions

Bibliography

Biography:

Charles Lane. James Pierrepont Greaves (J. Munroe, 1842).
J. E. M. Latham. Search for a new Eden: James Pierrepont Greaves (1777–1842) (Associated University presses, 1999).

Other books:

Pestalozzi, J. H. Letters on early education. Addressed to J. P. Greaves, esq. (London: Sherwood, Gilbert and Piper etc., 1827).
F. B. Sanborn. Bronson Alcott at Alcott house, England, and Fruitlands, New England (1842-1844) (The Torch Press, 1908).
R. C. S. Trahair. Utopias and Utopians: an historical dictionary (Greenwood Press, 1999), pp. 161–162.

Articles:
James Pierrepoint Greaves ("The Dial", volume 3, 1843 - pub. by Weeks, Jordan, and Co.) pp. 247–255, 281–296.
The New Age, and Concordium Gazette (pub. W. Strange, 1845) - the journal of the "Ham Common Concordium".
Julia Twigg. The vegetarian movement in England, 1847-1981: A study in the structure of its ideology (LSE doctoral thesis, 1981)

External links

Catalogue of Works by Greaves in the British Library

1777 births
1842 deaths
British vegetarianism activists
English educational theorists
English socialists
Founders of utopian communities
19th-century mystics
People from the London Borough of Merton